Guidance Tamil Nadu (formerly Tamil Nadu Industrial Guidance and Export Promotion Bureau ) is the investment promotion agency of the Government of Tamil Nadu. It is constituted to reach out to prospective investors and make them invest in the state of Tamil Nadu. It comes under the Industries Department and is under the purview of Minister for Industries Thangam Thennarasu.  Since inception, Guidance has facilitated investments for over Rupees Five lakh crore across various sectors. Guidance has evolved into an organisation that strives to transform the ecosystem in Tamil Nadu for investors to invest, innovate and create.

Team 
Guidance Tamil Nadu was established as a non-profit registered Society in 1992 with the objective of attracting major investment proposals into Tamil Nadu. Guidance has been restructured into a 40-member young team working out of their Chennai office. The team has qualified professionals with diverse backgrounds from MBA to legal experts and analysts. It has distinct verticals such as investment promotion, policy, external engagement, country desks, and social media. They have separate desks for overseeing country-specific and sector-specific investments. Pooja Kulkarni, an IAS officer of 2003 batch holds the position of Managing Director at Guidance Tamil Nadu.

Mandate 
Guidance was established ‘to serve as a focal point for dissemination of information and render facilitation to entrepreneurs with a view to giving fillip to the industrial growth of the State’. As per the Tamil Nadu Business Facilitation Act, 2018, Guidance Bureau has been given the statutory responsibility of functioning as the Nodal Agency for providing incentives and single window clearances for all enterprises other than MSMEs. Guidance is the designated Investment Promotion agency of the state and with this mandate, it undertakes the following functions to facilitate investments and promote the State to prospective investors:

Investment Promotion 
Investment promotion in all manufacturing and service sectors, generate leads and develop them into investments generating employment into Tamil Nadu and investment promotion through country specific desks.

Investment Facilitation & Aftercare 
Handhold investors setting up their operations in Tamil Nadu, undertake ease of doing business reforms, manage the Single Window Portal, Biz Buddy Portal andcoordinate on any issues relating to approvals and clearances.

External Engagement 
Connect with the international investor community and position TN globally, coordinate with Foreign Missions in India, Indian Missions abroad and international trade agencies, multilaterals, and bilateral agencies.

Policy and Research 
Conduct applied research and provide recommendations on industrial and investment policies and its implementation, track and monitor economy, industry and investments in the State and serve as a think tank for the Government.

Regional Outreach 
Provide ground support to existing investors, industry associations and potential investors across the various regions/districts in the state, liaison with investors and help resolve their issues through Biz Buddy.

Media & Communication 
Promote TN as an investment destination and disseminate information on the State’s investment promotion activities through social media, digital and print media, and management of public relations.

COVID Management & Recovery Initiatives 
Guidance, under the aegis of the Industries Department, and in collaboration with other Government departments and agencies, undertook several measures to mitigate the effects of the pandemic for industries and carried out several initiatives to restore the confidence of the investors.

COVID Helpline Team 
Guidance operated 24x7 during the pandemic and created two helpline teams for COVID -19 support activities to provide clarification and assistance on issues like truck movement, blockades at district / state borders, movement of groceries and edible items stuck at borders, permissions to operate / do maintenance at factories, vehicle passes, employee passes, shipments stuck at airports, etc. Over 4000 calls were facilitated by the helpline during the first quarter of Financial Year 2021-22, during the peak of the pandemic. Guidance also reached out to more than 200 PPE, ventilators and N95 masks suppliers / distributors and facilitated the logistics involved in the pandemic. Further, Guidance team set up country specific COVID helpline with Consul Generals of various countries including Korea, Denmark, Japan, USA, UK, Taiwan, Singapore and Australia to ensure swift resolution of issues.

Facilitating Supply of Medical Oxygen and Oxygen Concentrators 
With the help of Inox Air Products, Indian Railways, and other stakeholders, 4 ISO containers were airlifted from the Netherlands to West Bengal wherein liquid medical oxygen was filled and containers were moved to Tamil Nadu. Many companies and trade bodies came together to donate oxygen concentrators to the state. The US-India Strategic Partnership Forum (USISPF) generously donated 486 concentrators by airlifting it from Foshan, China for Tamil Nadu. Korean companies that have made Tamil Nadu their home such as Hyundai and Samsung also donated 300+ oxygen  concentrators. Licenses were issued swiftly to three companies to convert their industrial 23 oxygen units to produce medical oxygen. This resulted in an additional 15 MT of medical oxygen generation in the state. Oxygen demand increased significantly during the second wave of the COVID pandemic. In order to meet the unprecedented demand for oxygen, the Government of Tamil Nadu has taken special measures to bring in Liquid Medical Oxygen from Chhattisgarh, Odisha, West Bengal and Maharashtra. 5751.99 MT of liquid oxygen was brought by road and rail from the above States.

Facilitating Vaccination of Industrial Workforce 
In collaboration with SIPCOT, DIC, Health Department and various trade bodies, Guidance facilitated uptake of vaccination among the industrial workforce across the state. Over one lakh employees above the age of 45 were 24 vaccinated in this initiative. Hon’ble Chief Minister of Tamil Nadu has inaugurated vaccination camp at Tiruppur Nethaji Readymade Textile Park on 21.05.2021. In continuation of this, Hon’ble Chief Minister has also opened a vaccination centre on 26.05.2021 at automobile giant Daimler India’s manufacturing unit at Oragadam.

Functions 
It promotes Tamil Nadu as the most preferred investment destination and improves the ease of doing business parameters of the state. It assists both the domestic and international investors in the industrial approvals required by the business to operate in the state. It coordinates with investors and other government departments for the single window clearance. It also helps investors identify the land of their business choice, for SIPCOT and Private Industrial Parks.

Partnerships 
Partnering with the World Economic Forum (WEF), it established India’s first advanced manufacturing hub (AMHUB) in Tamil Nadu. It is one of the 19 AMHUBs in the world.  This platform focuses on engaging entire regional production ecosystems to identify and address regional opportunities and challenges brought by the Fourth Industrial Revolution by amplifying regional success stories, sharing best practices & incubating new partnerships. Tamil Nadu will be able to harness opportunities in the sectors of electronics, electric mobility, solar energy and textiles through this collaboration with AMHUB.

It also entered into an agreement with Indian School of Business (ISB) to work on a broader objective of economic recovery and growth. It is a tripartite partnership where Academia, Government and Industry come together to work on economic development of the State.

Other Key Industrial Promotion Organisations of Government of Tamil Nadu

References 

State agencies of Tamil Nadu
1992 establishments in Tamil Nadu
Government agencies established in 1992
Business organisations based in India